Engine House No. 7 is a former Columbus Fire Department station in the Weinland Park neighborhood of Columbus, Ohio. It was built in 1894 and was listed on the Columbus Register of Historic Properties in 1994. Today the building houses a local branch of the Communications Workers of America, Local 4501.

History

The engine house was completed in 1894. Around 1966, the fire department vacated the building, moving to a new facility at 1245 Indianola Avenue. Around 1965, the city began leasing the old building to the owner of a Ford dealership nearby, who began using it for parts storage. The dealership owner purchased the building in 1970.

Around 1980, the former fire station was suggested to house a collection of fire equipment, historical records, and old fire engines, and become the city's first firefighting museum. The former Engine House No. 1 instead came to house these items, as the Central Ohio Fire Museum.

In 1982, a new owner, a local developer, submitted plans to restore and rehabilitate the building while turning it into a hardware store. The owner also expressed a desire to eventually house a restaurant there.

The building has housed a local branch of the Communications Workers of America, Local 4501, for decades. In August 1994, the labor union nominated the building to the Columbus Register of Historic Properties, and it was approved and listed in November of that year.

Status

The station is one of about twelve built or reconstructed in the city in the 1890s. Of these, seven remain, though in various conditions. The other 1890s stations in Columbus include:

 Engine House No. 5, built in 1894, at 121 Thurman Avenue
 Engine House No. 6, built in 1892, at 540 W. Broad Street
 Engine House No. 8, at 283 N. 20th Street
 Engine House No. 10, built in 1897, at 1096 W. Broad Street
 Engine House No. 11, built in 1896, at 1000 E. Main Street
 Engine House No. 12, built in 1896, at 734 Oak Street

References

External links

 CWA Local 4501

Columbus Register properties
Buildings and structures in Columbus, Ohio
1894 establishments in Ohio
Fire stations completed in 1894
University District (Columbus, Ohio)
Fire stations in Columbus, Ohio
Defunct fire stations in Ohio
Communications Workers of America